Salimiyya may refer to:

 Salimiyya Madrasa, a 16th-century madrasa in Damascus, Syria
 Salimiyya Takiyya, a takiyya in as-Salihiyya, Damascus
 Sālimiyya, a Sufi movement in Basra
 Salmiya, a city in Hawalli Governorate in Kuwait
 Salemiyeh, a village in Gazin Rural District, Iran

See also 
 Selimiye (disambiguation)